The men's 20 kilometres walk race walk event at the 1960 Olympic Games took place on September 2.  The event was held in a final only format.

Results

Final

Key: DQ = disqualified; DNF = did not finish

References

M
Racewalking at the Olympics
Men's events at the 1960 Summer Olympics